Aegomorphus circumflexus is a species of beetle in the family Cerambycidae. It was described by Jacquelin du Val in 1857.

References

Aegomorphus
Beetles described in 1857